Winter Springs is a city in Seminole County, Florida, United States. The population was 38,342 at the 2020 census.  It is part of the Orlando–Kissimmee–Sanford Metropolitan Statistical Area.

The city was originally "North Orlando," but because it was not adjacent to the city of Orlando, the confusion led to the new name "Winter Springs."

Awards and press
The City of Winter Springs was ranked by the August 2011 issue of Money Magazine as the 97th best place to live in the United States.

Demographics

At the 2000 census, there were 31,666 people in 11,774 households, including 8,901 families, in the city. The racial makeup of the city was 88.73% White, 4.59% African American, 0.19% Native American, 1.94% Asian, 0.04% Pacific Islander, 2.52% from other races, and 1.99% from two or more races. Hispanic or Latino of any race were 10.52% of the population. There is a Jewish community.

Of the 11,774 households 38.1% had children under the age of 18 living with them, 61.2% were married couples living together, 11.1% had a female householder with no husband present, and 24.4% were non-families. 18.8% of households were one person and 6.4% were one person aged 65 or older. The average household size was 2.69 and the average family size was 3.08.

The age distribution was 27.0% under the age of 18, 7.3% from 18 to 24, 29.4% from 25 to 44, 25.4% from 45 to 64, and 10.8% 65 or older. The median age was 37 years. For every 100 females, there were 94.3 males. For every 100 females age 18 and over, there were 90.2 males.

The median household income was $58,247 and the median family income  was $75,682. Males had a median income of $64,716 versus $39,720 for females. The per capita income for the city was $26,166. About 3.3% of families and 4.2% of the population were below the poverty line, including 4.5% of those under age 18 and 4.8% of those age 65 or over.

Churches

Central Baptist Church
Church Alive
Life Community Church
First Baptist Church of Winter Springs
The Church at 434
Merge Church
Metro Church
St. Stephen Catholic Community
Willow Creek Presbyterian Church of America
New Covenant Church
Fellowship Church of Winter Springs

Synagogues
 Temple Israel 
 Rosh Chodesh Society

Schools
The City of Winter Springs has seven public schools and many private schools located within its city borders. While not within the city of Winter Springs, University of Central Florida and Full Sail are close to the community.

Elementary schools

 Rainbow Elementary
 Keeth Elementary
 Layer Elementary
 Highlands Elementary
 Winter Springs Elementary
 Choices in Learning Elementary Charter School
 Primrose School of Winter Springs (Preschool–Kindergarten)
 Creative Inspiration Journey School (Preschool–Kindergarten)

Middle school
 Indian Trails Middle School

High school
Winter Springs High School

Other schools

 Arbor School of Central Florida (K–12, a special education school)
 Willow School of Winter Springs (grades 2–12, for students with learning disorders)

Notable people

 Denee Benton, Tony award winning actress
 Caskey, rapper
 Ocky Clark, track and field Olympian coaches at Winter Springs
 A. J. Cole, Toronto Blue Jays, MLB
 Kirby Grant, actor
 Kawika Mitchell, pro football player was born in Winter Springs and attended Lake Howell High School
 Brooklynn Prince, actress
 Zachary "Sneaky" Scuderi, professional AD Carry in the MOBA League of Legends

References

External links

 
Winter Springs City Guide

Cities in Seminole County, Florida
Greater Orlando
Cities in Florida